Ambilad is a village in Kannur district of Kerala, India.

Geography 
Ambilad is 24 km from the district headquarters, Kannur. It is in Kuthuparamba municipality.

References

Villages near Kannur airport